T. brassicae may refer to:

 Trichogramma brassicae, a polyphagous wasp
 Tubercularia brassicae, a fungus in the family Nectriaceae
 Tuberculariella brassicae, a fungus in the family Dermateaceae